Mathureshpur Union is a union parishad in Kaliganj Upazila of Satkhira District, in Khulna Division, Bangladesh.

References

Unions of Kaliganj Upazila
Populated places in Satkhira District